This is a list of the cities that are or have been considered capitals of one of the country subdivisions of Brazil. For the national capital see: Capital of Brazil.

State capitals

Acre
created out of Amazonas
 Porto Acre, present Xapuri (1899-1903?) - seat city for the Independent State of Acre
 Rio Branco (1920–1963) - seat city for the territory do Acre
 Rio Branco (1963–present) - seat city for the State of Acre

Alagoas
created out of Pernambuco
 Alagoas (1817–1822) - seat city for the Captaincy of Alagoas
 Alagoas (1822–1839) - capital city for the Province of Alagoas
 Maceió (1839–present) - capital city for the Province of Alagoas
 Maceió (1889–present) - capital city for the State of Alagoas

Amapá
created out of Pará
 Macapá (1943–1988) - seat city for the territory do Amapá
 Macapá (1988–present) - seat city for the State of Amapá

Amazonas
created out of Pará
 Mariuá (1755–1791) - seat city for the Captaincy of São José do Rio Negro
 São José da Barra do Rio Negro (1791–1799) - seat city for the Captaincy of São José do Rio Negro
 Mariuá (1799–1808) - seat city for the Captaincy of São José do Rio Negro
 São José da Barra do Rio Negro (1808–1822) - seat city for the Captaincy of São José do Rio Negro; since 1856, named Manaus
 subject to the Province of Grão-Pará (1822–1850)
 Manaus (1850–1889) - seat city for the Province of Amazonas
 Manaus (1889–present) - seat city for the State of Amazonas

Bahia
 Cidade do São Salvador da Bahia de Todos os Santos (1549–1709) - seat city for the Captaincy of Baía de Todos os Santos
 Salvador (1709–1889) - seat city for the Captaincy of Bahia
 Salvador (1822–1889) - seat city for the Province of Bahia
 Salvador (1889–present) - seat city for the State of Bahia

Ceará
 Fortaleza (1799–1822) - seat city for the Captaincy of Ceará
 Fortaleza (1822–1889) - seat city for the Province of Ceará
 Fortaleza (1889–present) - seat city for the State of Ceará

Espírito Santo
 Vitória (1812–1822) - seat city for the Captaincy of Espírito Santo
 Vitória (1822–1889) - seat city for the Province of Espírito Santo
 Vitória (1889–present) - seat city for the State of Espírito Santo

Goiás
created out of São Paulo
 Goiás (1748–1822) - seat city for the Captaincy of Goiás
 Goiás (1822–1889) - seat city for the Province of Goiás
 Goiás (1889–1937) - seat city for the State of Goiás
 Goiânia (1937–present) - seat city for the State of Goiás

Maranhão
created out of Pará
 São Luís (1772–1822) - seat city for the Captaincy of Maranhão and Piauí
 São Luís (1822–1889) - seat city for the Province of Maranhão
 São Luís (1889–present) - seat city for the State of Maranhão

Mato Grosso
created out of São Paulo
 Vila Bela da Santíssima Trindade (1748–1821) - seat city for the Captaincy of Mato Grosso
 Cuiabá (1821–1889) - seat city for the Province of Mato Grosso
 Cuiabá (1889–present) - seat city for the State of Mato Grosso

Mato Grosso do Sul
created out of Mato Grosso
 Campo Grande (1975–present) - seat city for the State of Mato Grosso do Sul

Minas Gerais
created out of São Paulo
 Vila Rica (1720–1822) - since 1822, named Ouro Preto; seat city for the Captaincy of Minas Gerais
 Ouro Preto (1822–1889) - seat city for the Province of Minas Gerais
 Ouro Preto (1889–1897) - seat city for the State of Minas Gerais
 Belo Horizonte (1897–present) - seat city for the State of Minas Gerais

Pará
 Belém (1737–1772) - seat city for the State of Grão-Pará and Maranhão
 Belém (1772–1822) - seat city for the State of Grão-Pará and Rio Negro
 Belém (1822–1850) - seat city for the Province of Grão-Pará
 Belém (1850–1889) - seat city for the Province of Pará
 Belém (1889–present) - seat city for the State of Pará

Paraíba
 sem sede to the Captaincy of Itamaracá (1534–1574)
 capitania extinta (1574–1585)
 Nossa Senhora das Neves (1585–1588)
 Filipéia (1588–1634)
 Frederikstadt (1634–1654)
 Nossa Senhora das Neves (1654–1753) - seat city for the Captaincy of Paraíba
 subject to the Captaincy of Pernambuco (1753–1799)
 Paraíba do Norte (1799–1817) - seat city for the Captaincy of Paraíba
 Paraíba do Norte (1817–1822) - seat city for the Captaincy of Paraíba
 Paraíba (1822–1889) - seat city for the Province of Paraíba
 João Pessoa (1889–present) - até 1930, named "Cidade da Paraíba"

Paraná
created out of São Paulo
 Curitiba (1853–1889) - seat city for the Province of Paraná
 Curitiba (1889–present) - seat city for the State of Paraná

Pernambuco
 Olinda (1537–1630) - seat city for the Captaincy of Pernambuco
 Mauritsstad or Cidade Maurícia (1630–1654) - seat city for the Dutch administration.
 Olinda (1654–1822) - seat city for the Captaincy of Pernambuco
 Olinda (1822–1837) - seat city for the Province of Pernambuco
 Recife (1837–1889) - seat city for the Province of Pernambuco
 Recife (1889–present) - seat city for the State of Pernambuco

Piauí
created out of Maranhão
 Parnaíba (1718–1759) - seat city for the Captaincy of Piauí (subject to Maranhão)
 Oeiras (1759–1811) - seat city for the Captaincy of Piauí (subject to Maranhão)
 Oeiras (1811–1822) - seat city for the Captaincy of Piauí
 Oeiras (1822–1852) - seat city for the Province of Piauí
 Teresina (1852–1889) - seat city for the Province of Piauí
 Teresina (1889–present) - seat city for the State of Piauí

Rio Grande do Norte
 Captaincy of Rio Grande, sem sede (1534–1634)
 subject to the Dutch administration (1634–1654)
 subject to the Captaincy of Bahia (1654–1701)
 subject to the Captaincy of Pernambuco (1701–1822)
 Natal (1822–1889) - seat city for the Province of Rio Grande do Norte
 Natal (1889–present) - seat city for the State of Rio Grande do Norte

Rio Grande do Sul
 Viamão (until 1773)
 Porto Alegre (1773–1807) - named "Porto dos Casais" until 1773
 Porto Alegre (1807–1822) - seat city for the Captaincy of São Pedro and Rio Grande do Sul
 Porto Alegre (1822–1889) - seat city for the Province of Rio Grande do Sul
 Porto Alegre (1889–present) - seat city for the State of Rio Grande do Sul

Rio de Janeiro
 Niterói (1834–1889) - até 1835, named "Vila Real da Praia Grande"; seat city for the Province of Rio de Janeiro
 Niterói (1889–1892) - seat city for the State of Rio de Janeiro
 Petrópolis (1894–1903) - seat city for the State of Rio de Janeiro
 Niterói (1903–1975) - seat city for the State of Rio de Janeiro
 Rio de Janeiro (1975–present) - seat city for the State of Rio de Janeiro

Rondônia
Created in 1943 under the name of "territory do Guaporé", desmembrado do Mato Grosso. Reorganised into the State of Rondônia in 1988.
 Porto Velho (1988–present)

Roraima
Created in 1943 under the name of "territory do Rio Branco", desmembrado do Amazonas. Transformado in State of Roraima in 1988.
 Boa Vista (1988–present) - anteriormente named "Rio Branco"

Santa Catarina
created out of São Paulo
 Nossa Senhora do Desterro (1738–1822) - seat city for the Captaincy of Santa Catarina
 Nossa Senhora do Desterro (1822–1889) - seat city for the Province of Santa Catarina
 Laguna (1839) - seat city for the República Juliana
 Florianópolis (1889–present) - até 1894, named "Nossa Senhora do Desterro"; seat city for the State of Santa Catarina

São Paulo
 São Vicente (1534–1709) - seat city for the Captaincy of São Vicente
 Santos (1534–1624) - seat city for the Captaincy of Santo Amaro
 São Paulo (1709–1720) - seat city for the Captaincy of São Paulo and Minas de Ouro
 São Paulo (1720–1821) - seat city for the Captaincy of São Paulo
 São Paulo (1821–1889) - seat city for the Province of São Paulo
 São Paulo (since 1889) - seat city for the State of São Paulo

Sergipe
created out of Bahia
 São Cristóvão (1820–1822) - seat city for the Captaincy of Sergipe
 São Cristóvão (1822–1855) - seat city for the Province of Sergipe
 Aracaju (1855–1889) - seat city for the Province of Sergipe
 Aracaju (1889–present) - seat city for the State of Sergipe

Tocantins
created out of Goiás
 Palmas (1988–present)

Extinct federated units

Guanabara
Created in 1960 out of the territory of former Distrito Federal. Merged with the State of Rio de Janeiro in 1975.
 Rio de Janeiro (1960–1975)

Fernando de Noronha
Created in 1943 under the name of "territory de Fernando de Noronha". Incorporated by Pernambuco state.
 Vila dos Remédios (main inhabited nucleus of Fernando de Noronha (1943–1988) )

Iguaçu
Created in 1943 under the name de "territory do Iguaçu". Merged back to Paraná and the Santa Catarina.
 Laranjeiras do Sul (1943–1946)

Ponta-Porã
Created in 1943 under the name de "territory de Ponta-Porã". Merged back to Mato Grosso.
 Ponta Porã (1943–1946)

São João da Palma
Built in 1808 as captaincy by decree of King João VI under the name "São João das Duas Barras", was abolished in 1814. Recreated as an autonomous province in 1821 under the name of "São João da Palma", extinct in 1823 by Pedro I of Brazil. Today part of Pará and Tocantins.

 Barra do Tacay-Una (currently Marabá) (1808-1810)
 Vila de Palma (currently Paranã) (1810-1814)
 Cavalcante (1821-1823)

Former territories of Brazil

Cisplatina
 Montevidéu (1809–1828)

Guiana Francesa
 Caiena (1809–1817)

References 

Capitals
Brazil